Smoky Hills PBS (formerly Smoky Hills Public Television) is a regional network of Public Broadcasting Service (PBS) member television stations serving central and western portions of the U.S. state of Kansas. It is operated by the Smoky Hills Public Television Corporation, a non-profit organization which holds the licenses for all of the stations licensed in the network. The broadcast signals of the four stations cover most of the western half of the state outside Wichita.

The network produces public affairs programming and holds the broadcast rights to several Kansas high school athletic championship events sanctioned by the Kansas State High School Activities Association. The network's offices and network operations center are located in Bunker Hill (just east of Russell), in a historic native stone building.

History
The Smoky Hills Public Television Corporation was founded in 1978, with the intent to start a non-commercial educational television station in western Kansas. This region is part of the Wichita–Hutchinson Plus market, an unusually large market that covers over 70 counties stretching from the Flint Hills to the Colorado border–almost three-fourths of the state. It is the largest designated market area (DMA) by number of counties in the United States. Previously, much of the area received PBS programming on cable via either Wichita member station KPTS (channel 8) or Denver member station KRMA-TV (channel 6).

Flagship station KOOD (channel 16) in Hays was the first station in the network to sign on the air on November 10, 1982. This was followed by the debut of full-power satellites KSWK (channel 8) in Lakin (also serving Garden City) on March 15, 1989 and KDCK (channel 21) in Dodge City on March 3, 1998. KWKS (channel 19) in Colby was the last satellite to sign on, debuting as a digital-only station, in June 2007.

Most viewers watch Smoky Hills PBS's programming through cable, which is all but essential for acceptable television in most of this vast area due to its hilly terrain. In 2005, satellite providers DirecTV and Dish Network began carrying the network in the Wichita market, boosting its potential viewership to over 1.5 million people in Kansas and Nebraska.

Stations

Notes:
1. KOOD used the call sign KSMH-TV during its construction permit from 1980 to 1982.
2. KDCK and KWKS did not have companion digital channels, and therefore are operating on their pre-transition channels, which map to the same channels via PSIP. KDCK flash-cut its digital signal into operation in 2003.

Until 2009, Smoky Hills Public Television also relayed its signal on seven low-power translator stations:

The Hoxie translator was owned by the government of Sheridan County, the others were owned by the Smoky Hills Public Television Corporation. All of the translators were taken out of service upon the digital television transition in 2009 as KWKS-DT covered over the Northwest Kansas translators: K15CG; K23BU; K32BY; K39BS; & K69DB.

Digital television

Digital channels
The digital channels of each of the Smoky Hills PBS stations are multiplexed:

Analog-to-digital conversion
Although the DTV Delay Act extended the mandatory deadline to June 12, 2009, Smoky Hills Public Television shut down the analog signals of two of its stations as originally scheduled on February 17, 2009, the original date in which full-power television stations in the United States were scheduled to transition from analog to digital broadcasts. KOOD and KSWK shut down their respective analog signals, over UHF channel 16 and VHF channel 8, on that date. KOOD's digital signal remained on its pre-transition UHF channel 16; KSWK's digital signal remained on its pre-transition VHF channel 8. Through the use of PSIP, digital television receivers display KOOD's virtual channel as its former VHF analog channel 9 and KSWK's virtual channel as its former VHF analog channel 3.

Programming
Locally produced programs broadcast by Smoky Hills PBS include the medical advice program Doctors On Call, the public affairs program The Kansas Legislature, the high school sports highlight program Scoreboard Show and the music program Down Home Country: Live in Branson. The network also holds broadcast rights to the Miss Southwest Kansas Pageant as well as several Kansas high school athletic championship events sanctioned by the Kansas State High School Activities Association (including the Eight-Man Division 1 and 2 Football Championship games, Class 3-2-1A state wrestling tournament and the Class 1A girls' and boys' basketball tournament championship games). Smoky Hills PBS also broadcasts the Signature Auction, an annual fundraiser held each March; as well as Kansas Candidates, an ongoing series held during the election season.

References

External links

Down Home Country: Live In Branson website

Television stations in Kansas
PBS member networks
Television channels and stations established in 1982
Television channels and stations established in 1989
Television channels and stations established in 1998
Television channels and stations established in 2007